Gabriel Martelino Reyes (March 24, 1892 – October 10, 1952) was the 28th archbishop of Manila, and the first native Filipino to hold that post. He previously served as Archbishop of Cebu from 1934 to 1949, and then served as Archbishop of Manila from 1949 till his death in 1952.

Biography
Gabriel M. Reyes was born on March 24, 1892, in Kalibo, (then a part of Capiz). He entered St. Vincent Ferrer Seminary in Jaro, Iloilo City at the age of 13, during the time of Bishop Frederick Rooker. He was ordained a priest, on March 27, 1915 by Dennis Joseph Dougherty, the then-bishop of the then-Diocese of Jaro. After ordination, Gabriel was immediately appointed coadjutor parish priest of the future cardinal at the Cathedral Parish of Jaro. After a few months Mons. Dougherty made him the parish priest of the cathedral.

A few months later Gabriel was sent to a very challenging mission to Balasan, Iloilo, the farthest town of Iloilo up north. As the parish priest of this town, he covered sixteen small islands with neither roads, chapels nor convents but only ruins amidst an increasing number of Aglipayan and Protestant churches.

In 1918, he was transferred to be the parish priest of Capiz, Capiz (now Roxas, Capiz).  On July 20, 1920, he was chosen as the diocesan chancellor and secretary by the new bishop of Jaro, Mons. James McClosky. He was also the parish priest of Santa Barbara, Iloilo.

In 1927, he was named the vicar general of Jaro.

Five years later, Mons. Gabriel Reyes was appointed by the Holy See as Bishop of Cebu. He received his episcopal consecration in the Cathedral of Jaro, on October 11, 1932, from the Apostolic Delegate, Archbishop Guillermo Piani, S.D.B., with Mons. James McClosky - Bishop of Jaro, and Mons. Alfredo Verzosa, Bishop of Lipa, as co-consecrators. Two days after, he was installed in Cebu.

On April 28, 1934, after more than three centuries, the Diocese of Cebu was elevated by Pope Pius XI into an archdiocese, with Gabriel Reyes as the first archbishop. In Cebu Mons. Reyes ordained every year dozens of new candidates to the priesthood. He established the Parishes of Guadalupe, Tabuelan, Simala and Santa Lucia to add to the existing parishes, and launched an evangelization program. He also started the “Catholic Hour” over radio station DZRC.

On August 25, 1949, he was appointed by Pope Pius XII as coadjutor to Archbishop Michael O’Doherty of Manila with right of succession (and apostolic administrator sede plena). On the death of the Archbishop on September 29, 1949, he took over the archi-episcopal See of Manila, being its first Filipino archbishop.

On October 14, 1949, he was installed as Archbishop of Manila and took canonical possession of this See of Manila.

Last years and legacy

Reyes became ill, and died at the age of 60 on October 10, 1952 in a hospital in Washington, D.C.

He was the immediate predecessor of two Filipino prelates who became cardinals: Julio Rosales, who succeeded him in Cebu, and Rufino Santos, who succeeded him in Manila.

Archbishop Reyes renovated the Cebu Cathedral, which had been  bombed during World War II.  He established parochial schools, and the Cebu archdiocesan officer newspaper Diaro-Kabuhi Sang Banua. As archbishop of Manila, he oversaw the construction of the new campus of San Carlos Seminary in Makati in 1951. A Catholic center he wished to build when he became archbishop of Manila was built by his successor, the Pope Pius XII Catholic Center, on U.N. Avenue in Manila. The Archbishop Gabriel M. Reyes Memorial Library (AGRM Library), the resource center of the San Carlos Pastoral Formation Complex, was dedicated in his honor.

In his hometown Kalibo, the street fronting his birthplace was named after him. Also, a monument was erected in his honor in his birthplace. In December 2015, the monument was transferred to a new location in the Kalibo Pastrana Park which was formally turned over by the Archbishop Gabriel Reyes Memorial Foundation to the local government of Kalibo on October 10, 2016, coinciding with his 64th death anniversary and the foundation's 39th anniversary.

Likewise, a major thoroughfare in Cebu City traversing from Barangay Camputhaw to the junction of Barangay Kasambagan, Lahug and Barrio Luz was named as Archbishop Reyes Avenue.

References

External links
Archbishop Gabiel Reyes (bio) from Bag-Ong Lunsoranon, newspaper of the Archdiocese of Cebu

1892 births
1952 deaths
Roman Catholic archbishops of Manila
People from Aklan
20th-century Roman Catholic archbishops in the Philippines
Burials at the Manila Cathedral
Roman Catholic bishops of Cebu
Roman Catholic archbishops of Cebu
Roman Catholic Archdiocese of Manila
Presidents of the Catholic Bishops' Conference of the Philippines